The Arado V.1 was a prototype airliner, built in Germany in 1927. It was a single-engine, high-wing braced monoplane with tailwheel undercarriage. It made several long-distance flights, including carrying mail to South America, before being exhibited in Berlin in 1929, when it was bought by Deutsche Luft Hansa.

Operational history
The sole V.I (D-1594), took part in the 1928 Berlin ILA-exhibition and was subsequently sold to Deutsche Luft Hansa  (DLH) in the Autumn of 1929 and named Tenerife on 12 December 1929. After a successful proving flight to Tenerife, the aircraft crashed near Berlin, on 19 December 1929, during its return flight, killing both pilots, though the mechanic survived.

Variants
Data from: German Aviation 1919-1945:Arado V.I
V.IA single aircraft, (D-1594), sold to DLH.
V.IaThe second aircraft, scrapped uncompleted, after DLH withdrew funding on the crash of the V.I.

Specifications (V.I)

References

Further reading

 

V I
High-wing aircraft
Single-engined tractor aircraft
1920s German airliners